The Primitive Methodist Magazine was the monthly magazine of the Primitive Methodist Church in Britain, spanning just over a century. It was started in 1821. From 1821, the Magazine was edited by Hugh Bourne, who printed the magazine at Bemersley Farm about 2 miles from Mow Cop.  Production was moved to London in 1843 when John Flesher became the Editor.  One of the more famous editors was H B Kendall, the writer of three major histories of Primitive Methodism.

The Magazine was initially produced as a paper cover booklet.  These were later bound in annual volumes, of which the Englesea Brook Museum of Primitive Methodism has a complete set.  Hugh Bourne's printing press is also amongst the exhibits at the Museum. The magazine existed until 1898.

See also
Methodist Recorder

References

External links 

 Englesea Brook Museum of Primitive Methodism

Monthly magazines published in the United Kingdom
Religious magazines published in the United Kingdom
Christian magazines
Defunct magazines published in the United Kingdom
Magazines published in England
Magazines published in London
Magazines established in 1821
Magazines disestablished in 1898